Raphitoma harpula is an extinct species of sea snail, a marine gastropod mollusk in the family Raphitomidae.

It was named Raphitoma harpula by Bellardi in 1847 .

Description
The length of the shell reaches 23 mm. Its diameter is 8 mm.

The very slender, fusiform, turriculate shell has a high spire and a pointed apex. The whorls are short, numerous and convex. The body whorl measures 2/5 of the total length. The sutures are impressed. The whorls contain 10–12 axial, hardly oblique ribs. They are narrow, prominent and compressed. The transverse striae are minute and then again obsolete between the interstices of the axial ribs. The columella is somewhat depressed backwards and slightly twisted. The siphonal canal is short and recurved to the right.

Distribution
Fossils of this marine species were found in Miocene strata of Emilia-Romagna, Italy.

References

 Brocchi G.B. (1814). Conchiologia fossile subapennina con osservazioni geologiche sugli Apennini e sul suolo adiacente. Milano. Vol. 1: i–lxxx, 1–56, 1–240; vol. 2: 241–712, 16 pls.

External links
 

harpula
Gastropods described in 1814